Wyner is a surname. Notable people with the surname include:

Aaron D. Wyner (1939–1997), American information theorist
George Wyner (born 1945), American actor
Irv Wyner (1904–2002), American film score composer
Yehudi Wyner (born 1929), American composer, pianist, conductor, and music educator